Jewish Social Studies is a quarterly U.S. based journal. 

It was established in 1939, by the Conference on Jewish Relations, later known as the Conference on Jewish Social Studies. Its editor was the American philosopher Morris Raphael Cohen. In the early 1970s, Arthur Hertzberg was editor; his motto was "we are universalists and particularists", caring for all men and caring for Jews.

The journal is currently published by Indiana University Press.

See also
Sociology of Jewry

References 

Publications established in 1939
Indiana University Press academic journals
Judaic studies journals
English-language journals
Quarterly journals
Sociology of Jewry